Platytes strigatalis is a moth in the family Crambidae. It was described by George Hampson in 1900. It is found in the Russian Far East (Amur, Ussuri).

References

Crambini
Moths described in 1900
Moths of Asia